Communications Biology is a peer-reviewed open access scientific journal covering research in biology. It was established in 2018 and is published by Nature Portfolio. It is a sister journal to Communications Physics and Communications Chemistry.

 the acting editor-in-chief is Christina Karlsson Rosenthal.

Abstracting and indexing 
The journal is abstracted and indexed in:

According to the Journal Citation Reports, the journal has a 2021 impact factor of 6.548, ranking it 15th out of 94 journals in the category "Biology".

See also
Nature
Nature Communications
Scientific Reports

References

External links

Nature Research academic journals
Biology journals
Publications established in 2018
English-language journals
Creative Commons Attribution-licensed journals
Continuous journals